Ranracancha (hispanicized spelling of Quechua Ranra Kancha, ranra, stony; stony ground, kancha corral,"stony corral") is one of the eight districts of the province Chincheros in Peru.

Ethnic groups 
The people in the district are mainly indigenous citizens of Quechua descent. Quechua is the language which the majority of the population (90.90%) learnt to speak in childhood, 8.87% of the residents started speaking using the Spanish language (2007 Peru Census).

References

1993 establishments in Peru
Populated places established in 1993
Districts of the Chincheros Province
Districts of the Apurímac Region